Thomas Spratt (born 20 December 1941) is an English former professional footballer who played as a half-back in the Football League for Bradford Park Avenue, Torquay United,  Workington, York City and Stockport County, in non-League football for Weymouth and Northwich Victoria and was on the books of Manchester United without making a league appearance. He was an England schools and youth international.

References

1941 births
Living people
Footballers from Northumberland
English footballers
England schools international footballers
England youth international footballers
Association football midfielders
Manchester United F.C. players
Bradford (Park Avenue) A.F.C. players
Weymouth F.C. players
Torquay United F.C. players
Workington A.F.C. players
York City F.C. players
Stockport County F.C. players
Northwich Victoria F.C. players
English Football League players